The Mayor's Office of Film, Theatre & Broadcasting (MOFTB) is the oldest film commission in the United States. It is New York City’s agency responsible for coordinating municipal support for film and television production, including approving film shoots and liaising with government agencies and promoting the industry. The office provides free permits, free public locations, and free police escorts. It also provides shooting guidelines, insurance information, and other useful information for local film and media production. Built upon mayoral initiatives dating back to Mayor John V. Lindsay in 1966 and Mayor Abraham Beame in 1974, the Mayor's Office today supports an industry that generates over $5 billion annually and employs over 100,000 New Yorkers.

History 
In his 1965 campaign for mayor, John Lindsay promised to lure runaway film productions back to New York City by streamlining the process of obtaining the necessary approvals to shoot in the city. At the time, separate approvals were required from several agencies before filming could begin. In 1966, permitting authority was consolidated within the New York City Department of Commerce. The city saw an immediate 100% increase in production over the previous year, bringing in an estimated additional $20 million in spending in the city. In 1974, Mayor Abraham Beame met with the newly formed New York Motion Picture and Television Council and its Chairman, Jerry Puchkoff. At that meeting Mayor Beame agreed to expand the city's support for the industry by forming the Mayor's Advisory Council on Motion Pictures and Television in which Jerry Puchkoff was also elected Co-Chairman. The Mayor's office was led by Director Walter Wood. In 1993, after a seven-month-long labor dispute between major studios and several theatrical unions which brought New York-based production to a near-standstill, Mayor David Dinkins elevated the office to cabinet status and appointed film industry professional Richard Brick as its first Commissioner. Since 2019, the office has been overseen by Anne del Castillo, who serves as Commissioner of the Mayor's Office of Media and Entertainment.

See also 
 Media of New York City
 Made in NY (incentive program)
 NYC Media
 WNYE (FM)
 WNYE-TV

References 

Government of New York City
Film commissions in the United States